Eyes on the Lines is the third studio album by American singer-songwriter Steve Gunn. It was released on June 3, 2016 under Matador Records.

Critical reception
Eyes on the Lines was met with universal acclaim reviews from critics. At Metacritic, which assigns a weighted average rating out of 100 to reviews from mainstream publications, this release received an average score of 83, based on 21 reviews.

Accolades

Track listing

Charts

References

2016 albums
Matador Records albums